The 2nd Army was a World War I and World War II field army of the Royal Italian Army.

World War I

Commanders
General Pietro Frugoni      (May 1915 - June 1916)
General Settimio Piacentini (July 1916 - June 1917)  
General Luigi Capello       (June 1917 - October 1917)
General Luca Montuori, ad interim (October 1917) 
General Luigi Capello       (October - November 1917)

World War II
During World War II the 2nd Army was the Italian (Complex Major) Great Unit charged, from 1940 to 1943, of the activities of control and garrison of the occupied or annexed territories of the former Kingdom of Yugoslavia.

2nd Army ORBAT, depending units:

 "Comando Superiore Forze Armate (FF.AA.) di Slovenia e Dalmazia" - "Supersloda"
 V Corps, in Lika
 VI Corps, in Herzegovina
 XI Corps, in Southern Dalmatia and Herzegovina
 XVIII Corps, from 18 February 1942; General Quirino Armellini then Umberto Spigo around Zara and Spalato responsible for the territories from Graciaz to the Narenta river
 Comando Truppe Montenegro: XIV Corps, in Montenegro (a functionally dependent Command and Great Unit but not a constituent part of the 2nd Army)

Initially 250,000 men strong in 15 divisions, the 4 immediately dependent Corps were then reduced to 230,000 men in 13 divisions. The 2nd Army was a second line force with most of the men in their late 30s and early 40s, the only really largely combat ready and effective (Simple Major) Great Unit was the assigned component of the Alpine Division Julia only partially deployed in the yugoslav theatre of operations as a whole unit. 
After the armistice of Cassibile on September 8, 1943 and the announcement by Italy of war on Germany, all activities ceased and the 2nd Army was dissolved in Mali Lošinj on 11 September.
Parts of the 2nd Italian army were withdrawn into the mountains of Dalmatia and joined the Yugoslav Partisans, under command of Josip Broz Tito, which formed the Italian Partisan Division "Garibaldi". Other parts of the 2nd Army also keep fighting against the Germans along with the Yugoslav partisans in Division Italia (Yugoslavia), during 1944-1945. They helped the Soviet and  Bulgarian army fighting against the German army in Croatia, Hungary and Austria.

Commanders
 General Vittorio Ambrosio (December 10, 1938 – January 20, 1942)
 General Mario Roatta (January 20, 1942 – February 5, 1943)
 General Mario Robotti (February 5, 1943 – September 8, 1943)

See also
 V.A.C.

Footnotes

Field armies of Italy in World War I
Field armies of Italy in World War II
Yugoslavia in World War II